Since their first appearance in 1963 there have been a number of variant models of the Daleks, a fictional alien race in the BBC science fiction television programme Doctor Who.

First seen in the serial The Daleks (1963–64), the outward manifestation is portrayed as a powerful, technically advanced travel machine in which a hideous and malevolent mutant, the Dalek creature, resides. Although the general appearance of the Daleks has remained the same, details of both the casing and the mutant creature have changed over time. Alterations were made to accommodate the requirements of specific plot elements in various serials and episodes or at the request of producers, designers and directors to revitalise the Dalek appearance. On other occasions design changes have been the result of practical considerations when filming the Dalek props on location, or the mixing of components acquired from different sources.

The episodes "Asylum of the Daleks" (2012), "The Magician's Apprentice" (2015) and "The Witch's Familiar" (2015) feature appearances by many of the Dalek variants seen in the Doctor Who programme since its inception.

Glossary of primary Dalek components
The component names listed below are used in this article as an aid to tracking the detail changes made to the basic Dalek design to create variants. From the base up, the major components are:
 fender: The projecting base of the Dalek prop. 
 skirt: The section with angled faces, to which the hemispheres are attached.
 hemispheres: Also known as "hemis" and "sense globes", fifty-six of these items (forty-eight on New Paradigm Daleks) are fixed in four rows to the skirt panels.
 shoulders: The section between the top of the skirt and the neck bin.
 collars: Two horizontal bands fitted around the shoulders.
 slats: Vertical rectangular panels fitted around the upper collar.
 shoulder mesh: Diamond-section mesh fitted between the slats and the upper collar.
 appendage boxes: Projecting boxes housing the ball joints for the arm and gun stick.
 gun stick: Usually portrayed as a variable discharge energy weapon.
 gun rods: Longitudinal rods forming a cage around the gun stick.
 gun mantles: Octagonal cross-members bracing the gun rods along their length.
 arm: A telescopic arm, having two or three sections.
 plunger: Fixed to the end of the arm and depicted as a Dalek's primary manipulating appendage.
 neck bin: The section between the shoulders and the dome.
 neck bin mesh: Mesh fitted between the neck bin and the neck rings.
 neck rings: Horizontal rings fitted around the neck bin.
 neck struts: Eight thin, vertical struts on the exterior of the neck bin, between the top of the shoulders and the dome.
 dome: The rotatable top component of the travel machine.
 dome lights: Lights fixed to the dome, which flash when the Dalek is shown speaking.
 eye stalk: A rod projecting from the dome, which can pivot vertically.
 eye discs: A series of discs of varying diameter through which the eye stalk is threaded.
 eyeball: A spherical component fitted to the end of the eye stalk, shown in various episodes to contain the Dalek's visual apparatus.
 eye lens: A circular lens at the front of the eyeball which, depending on the variant, is sometimes illuminated or has a central pupil.
 dome cowl: A structure which projects from the front of the dome and surrounds the eye stalk pivot. ("New Series" Daleks only)

General design

Overview
Externally Daleks have the appearance of a truncated cone varying between approximately 1.5 metres (5 feet) and 2 metres (6 feet 6 inches) tall depending upon the variant. They are equipped with a single mechanical rod-mounted eye which protrudes from a rotating dome, a directed energy weapon and a telescopic arm. Usually the arm is fitted with a manipulating device resembling a sink plunger. This item is shown in various episodes to be capable of holding people and objects, seemingly using a powerful vacuum. The weapon is depicted as having a variable output which can paralyse, stun or kill most life forms, disintegrate other Daleks and destroy buildings and spacecraft.

Casing
In Remembrance of the Daleks (1988) and the episodes "The Parting of the Ways" (2005) and "Doomsday" (2006) the Doctor states that Dalek casings are constructed from "bonded polycarbide", with this material being referred to as "dalekanium" in The Dalek Invasion of Earth (1964) and "Daleks in Manhattan" (2007). The casing is depicted as being impervious to most projectile and energy weapons, although not indestructible. In various episodes Daleks are shown being damaged or destroyed by overwhelming firepower, their own weaponry and falls from a height. In addition, in Revelation of the Daleks (1985), they are said to be vulnerable to "bastic-headed bullets". In appearances from 2005 onwards a Dalek's defensive capability has been shown to include an invisible force shield, with the eye remaining a weak point.

The lower shell is covered with hemispherical protrusions. In the BBC-licensed The Dalek Book (1964), and again in The Doctor Who Technical Manual (1983), these items are described as being part of a sensory array. In "Dalek" (2005) they are shown to act as components in a self-destruct mechanism.

Eye
Historically, a Dalek's eye has been depicted as its most vulnerable spot. In "Silence in the Library" (2008) the Doctor, speaking of how to deal with various alien menaces, says "Daleks: aim for the eye stalk". In the revived series from 2005 onwards, storylines have shown Daleks as having systems to protect their vision. In the 2008 episode "The Stolen Earth", Wilfred Mott attempts to disable a Dalek by blinding it using a paintball gun. The Dalek is seen to simply evaporate the paint from its eye.

Eye lens, eye discs and dome lights
While maintaining their general shape and appearance, the design of these components has varied over the years. Eye lenses were first shown as blank, white discs, sometimes featuring internal illumination. Later, lenses with a black "pupil" were introduced. "New Series" Daleks have a clear lens which glows with a blue light while New Paradigm Daleks, introduced in the episode "Victory of the Daleks" (2010), are equipped with an "organic eyeball" set behind a small transparent hemisphere. Throughout the 1960s Daleks were occasionally shown with a functioning iris, a feature also seen in the "New Series" Dalek design. The eye discs have varied in number, size, spacing, profile and configuration. Colour has generally been restricted to powder blue, white or gold, with "New Series" Dalek eye discs having a translucent, frosted appearance and those of the New Paradigm variant being black.

The dome-light covers first resembled table tennis balls, before items having the appearance of plastic egg cup inserts were substituted. Later these were replaced by various types of "bee skep-shaped" vehicle side light lenses. The flattened lights fitted to the Imperial Daleks seen in Remembrance of the Daleks were formed from Perspex discs capped by commercially available saucer-shaped plastic components, while "New Series" and New Paradigm Daleks have light-covers consisting of tubular beacon lenses, the former variant's being surrounded by a metal cage.

Underside
The underside structure of a Dalek casing was indeterminate until the publication of The Dalek Book  (1964). This included a cutaway drawing entitled "Anatomy of a Dalek" which showed it to have a base through which a large central sphere, surrounded by smaller satellite "balancing globes", protrudes. This layout was generally adopted and used in subsequent Dalek plans and comic strip representations. This is at variance with the few glimpses seen in early Doctor Who television episodes and films, which made little attempt to show (or hide) anything other than the actual base of the Dalek prop. As this usually took the form of a plywood board to which castors had been attached and a hole cut out for the operator's feet, these brief appearances were of little assistance in maintaining the illusion of the props being functional, armoured casings housing an alien being. This situation was finally remedied in the episode "Dalek" (2005) and subsequent appearances of the "New Series" Dalek. This variant is shown to have an underside consisting of a large, recessed central hemisphere surrounded by eight satellite hemispheres. The central hemisphere and four of the satellite hemispheres glow when the Dalek is in flight mode.

Dalek mutant

The creatures inside the "travel machines" are depicted as repulsive in appearance and vicious even without their mechanical armour. Rarely glimpsed until the programme's revival in 2005, they were usually shown as amorphous green blobs with strong tentacles capable of strangulation or, occasionally, as having clawed hands. Their appearance and evolution is variously attributed to radioactive fallout from a catastrophic war, artificially accelerating pre-existing genetic mutations in the Kaled species and the manipulation of genetic material forcibly obtained from other (usually human) species. From 2005 onward the Dalek creature has been seen more frequently, in its latest incarnation resembling a pale octopus-like being with a single viable eye, a vestigial nose and mouth, and an exposed brain.

In the episode "The Witch's Familiar" (2015) it is revealed that the mutants are biologically immortal, yet still gradually age to eventually rot away into a liquid mass. These decayed Daleks are ultimately deposited in Skaro's sewer system, where they decompose further into a living, maddened sludge.

Voice
Daleks have distinctive electronic voices, the harsh, staccato sound being created by actors speaking through a microphone into a device called a ring modulator. While this produces considerable distortion and a monotone effect, inflection and pace are used to express a range of emotions including rage, triumph, disdain and, very occasionally, fear. (  )

Locomotion and manoeuvrability
Dalek locomotion is usually shown as a gliding movement a few centimetres above the ground. The Dalek Book (1964) indicates that traction is provided by a large, omnidirectional rotating metal sphere, while in the serial Death to the Daleks (1974) the Doctor states that they move by psycho-kinetic power. For years Daleks were depicted as being unable to climb stairs, with travel confined to smooth ground and level surfaces. This was rectified in Revelation of the Daleks in which a hovering Dalek was seen briefly, and then in Remembrance of the Daleks which featured a Dalek levitating up a staircase. From 2005 various Doctor Who episodes have shown Daleks hovering and flying with ease, locomotion being imparted by anti-gravity generators.

Dalek variant naming conventions
During the course of the Doctor Who television programme the BBC, its producers and scriptwriters have rarely alluded to changes in Dalek design or ascribed names or designations to the various models seen. Notable exceptions usually refer to rank, such as "Emperor" and "Supreme Dalek", although in Genesis of the Daleks the newly created Dalek casing is referred to as a "Mark 3 Travel Machine".

The Dalek variant naming conventions used in this article are attributed to the various models as a matter of convenience. They can be found in general use by the Doctor Who/Dalek fan base, and are often quoted in posts and documentation on websites such as The Project Dalek Forum. Other classifications for the major Dalek variants exist. The Doctor Who Technical Manual (1983) places both television and Movie Daleks in the same numerical sequence by order of their first screen appearances, although reconciling the characters and events depicted in the Doctor Who films with those established in the TV programme is problematic.

The term "drone" is used in this article to indicate a Dalek having no rank. Its only use to date in the Doctor Who television serials and films in which the Daleks have appeared has been in the episodes "Victory of the Daleks" and "Revolution of the Daleks".

Mark 1 Daleks
The Daleks first appeared in the 1963 Doctor Who serial The Daleks. There are no visual cues to distinguish one Dalek from another, or suggestions in the story of a hierarchy.

The Mark 1 Dalek differs from later variants in having no shoulder slats or mesh, nine eye discs (the greatest number of any version) and a "toffee apple" shaped eyeball. The eye lenses are illuminated and shown to have an iris which can expand and contract. These Daleks have a silver colour scheme with blue/grey shoulders, blue hemispheres and eye discs, collars in natural aluminium and black fenders. The story refers to them being powered by static electricity, with mobility limited to the metal floors in the Dalek City on their home planet, Skaro.

In the episode "The Ambush" a Dalek is shown using a device resembling a thermal lance to cut through a door. It consists of a long, slim tube flanked by two globes, surmounted by a clear disc-shaped "sight screen". This appendage is mounted to the Dalek's arm in place of a plunger.

The Dalek concept was the creation of screenwriter Terry Nation, with the design being realised by BBC staff designer Raymond Cusick. The props were constructed by Shawcraft Engineering of Uxbridge, England under the direction of Bill Roberts, who also provided additional design input. Four 1960s style Dalek props were recreated by Titan Props for the British television docudrama An Adventure in Space and Time (2013), commissioned by the BBC to celebrate the Doctor Who programme's fiftieth anniversary.

Mark 2 Daleks
The storyline for the second serial to feature the Daleks, The Dalek Invasion of Earth (1964), required the props to be used extensively on location. Consequently, serial designer Spencer Chapman and manufacturer Shawcraft Engineering devised a tricycle arrangement, incorporating three pneumatic tyres, to replace the original castors and carry the props over uneven ground. Enlarged fenders were then created to hide the revised undercarriage.

To explain the Daleks' ability to travel away from the static-charged floors of their city, the narrative has the Doctor stating that an aerial located at the edge of a mine in Bedfordshire is the key to the Daleks' power supply on Earth. Although not referred to directly in the story, it is implied that the parabolic dishes now fitted to the rear shoulder section of each prop act as receptors for a form of transmitted energy. Other design changes are a reduction in the number of eye discs to five and painting some eyeballs silver instead of the standard black colour. An amphibious capability is demonstrated in the closing moments of the first episode of the serial when a Dalek emerges from beneath the waters of the River Thames.

For the first time a Dalek command structure is introduced, with rank indicated by differing colour schemes. The Earth Task Force Commander, or "Saucer Commander", features a black dome and alternating light and dark skirt panels. A Supreme Controller or "Black Dalek" is also seen with a black dome, shoulders and skirt.

Mark 3 Daleks
First introduced in 1965, the basic design of the Mark 3 Dalek variant remained relatively unchanged throughout their later appearances.

Mark 3 Daleks in the 1960s
The Mark 3 Dalek variant first appeared in The Chase (1965), with Ray Cusick returning as designer for the serial. As the production required no location filming and Cusick felt that Daleks should be shorter than an average person, he had the enlarged fenders and wheels, installed for The Dalek Invasion of Earth, removed and replaced with the original style of running gear. Greater flexibility in the storylines was afforded by freeing the Daleks from reliance on static-charged metal floors for power and mobility. For this and further serials, however, the contrivance of dish aerials as energy receptors was dispensed with. They were replaced by a steel mesh wrapped around the upper collar of each prop, over which were mounted twenty-three vertical, oblong slats ostensibly forming a power collection array (although this function has never been confirmed on screen).

A Black Dalek appears in the first episode of The Chase; "The Executioners". Daleks with non-standard arm appendages are also seen in this serial. A gimballed hemisphere referred to as both a "seismic detector" and a "TARDIS perceptor" appears, and in the episode "The Planet of Decision" an "electrode unit" is employed to disable an electronic lock. The prop consisted of a large revolving parabolic dish from the centre of which two converging rods protruded.

In the later 1960s serials in which they appeared the Dalek design remained virtually unchanged, with only minor variations to the standard colour scheme and appendages.

In The Daleks' Master Plan (1965) several Daleks are shown clearing areas of jungle using short, tubular flame throwers, referred to as "pyro-flame burners", in place of the standard plunger.

A Dalek with a circular sieve-like scoop attachment in place of its plunger is seen in The Power of the Daleks (1966). It is used for transferring embryonic Dalek mutants from a liquid-filled nurturing tank to their travel machine casings. For this serial and future appearance of the Mark 3 variant, the gun design was simplified by removing the mantles.

In The Evil of the Daleks (1967) a Black Dalek is seen again, this time with grey shoulders. Two more elements of the Dalek hierarchy are also introduced; the Dalek Emperor and Daleks with black domes which appear to act as the Emperor's personal guard. (This motif appears again in "The Parting of the Ways" (2005), with black-domed Daleks fulfilling a similar function.) For the first time a Dalek is seen with a black pupil centred in its eye lens.

An unusual version of the Mark 3 Dalek made an appearance in The Evil of the Daleks. It featured narrow skirt and shoulder sections, with the rear skirt panel having only a single vertical line of hemispheres down the middle. These differences are not alluded to in the story. This prop is sometimes referred to as "The Wilkie Dalek" after Bernard Wilkie, the BBC technical designer who became primarily responsible for the Doctor Who programme's visual effects after Shawcraft's involvement ceased during 1967.

Mark 3 Daleks in the 1970s
The Daleks returned in the 1972 serial Day of the Daleks, their first appearance in colour on the Doctor Who television programme. "Drone" Daleks were now finished in grey, with black hemispheres and fender. Except for Death to the Daleks (1974), and albeit with variations in the shade of grey and occasional adornment with black slats, black collars or both, this stayed as the standard Dalek colour scheme for the remaining eight serials in which they appeared over the next sixteen years. During this period, however, several small changes to the standard Mark 3 Dalek design were made and their hierarchy was again expanded.

In Day of the Daleks a Dalek Leader is seen painted in gold, with black hemispheres and fender. This serial also saw the first appearance of an oval disc between the appendage boxes and a higher fender on all models. The eye lens "pupil", first seen in The Evil of the Daleks, now became a standard fitting. A gold Dalek Leader returned again in Frontier in Space (1973).

Seven additional Dalek props were produced for Planet of the Daleks (1973), created by special effects professional Clifford Culley's company Westbury Design & Optical Limited. The production crew referred to these props as "goons". Although fabricated using measurements and moulds taken from an existing prop, the "goon" Daleks exhibited minor differences from the original Shawcraft builds including the substitution of single dowel neck struts for the trefoil cross section items which were the norm up to this point. The story again called for a Dalek to cut through a metal door, on this occasion the cutting device replacing the plunger resembling the tip of a large soldering iron. This serial also featured a unique variant; the Dalek Supreme.

In Death to the Daleks the travel machines display a silver livery with black shoulders, hemispheres and fender, with a task force leader being differentiated from its subordinates by amber, instead of clear, dome lights. During the serial, due to a plot element, the standard blasters are replaced by projectile weapons featuring a drilled barrel with six small fins at the muzzle. After killing two primitive humanoids with these devices a Dalek declares them to be "...moderately efficient". The phasing-out of three section telescopic arms commenced in this serial, with two sections becoming the norm for the remainder of the classic series.

In Destiny of the Daleks (1979) many of the Dalek props feature an attachment resembling a small stub aerial projecting from the top of the dome. Six crude, hollow, vacuum-formed Dalek props were also created. They were primarily used during location filming of the serial's finale, although several of them can also be seen in the background of some studio shots. They can be recognised by their thick neck struts and the absence of dome aerials and appendage ball joints. Production photographs taken at the time reveal that they also lacked hemispheres on the rear skirt panels.

A group of Daleks are seen in this story forming a suicide squad to destroy an enemy spacecraft, each with a number of bombs attached to its shoulder section. The bomb props consist of yellow cylinders capped at the ends by red hemispheres.

A Mark 3 drone Dalek with a distinctive design also appears in Destiny of the Daleks. It features a combination of "goon" and Shawcraft Dalek sections for the upper half, and a unique skirt with a rear section which flares out from the shoulders at almost the same angle as the front. Four prominent bolt heads frame the chest oval and large hemispheres are fitted. These differences are not alluded to in the story and the origin of the components remains uncertain. This variant is sometimes referred to as "The Tussauds Dalek" after Madame Tussauds wax museum in London, where it was exhibited (painted bright blue and silver) as part of their Doctor Who display in the 1980s.

Mark 3 Daleks in the 1980s
Commencing with a cameo appearance in the Doctor Who serial The Five Doctors (1983), Mark 3 Dalek variants seen during this decade feature a neck bin raised so that a strip of it is visible between the lower neck ring and the top of the shoulders. The fitting of a small stub aerial to the dome continued, appearing for the last time in Resurrection of the Daleks (1984).

The eyestalks and discs of standard Daleks in Resurrection of the Daleks are painted white, with four discs arranged in a conical layout, smallest disc to the front. The Tussauds Dalek prop appears in this serial under two guises; a grey drone and a Supreme Dalek painted in gloss black with white hemispheres. The Tussauds Dalek features briefly once more in Revelation of the Daleks, again portraying a drone.

Dalek Emperor

In The Evil of the Daleks (1967) the Emperor is presented as a towering, immobile, twelve-sided conical structure to which numerous umbilical cables are connected. Twelve large, black hemispheres girdle its midsection with a further two smaller, tan-coloured hemispheres being mounted horizontally on the chest. It has a predominantly white colour scheme with black detailing and speaks in an echoing, grating voice. Shown mounted on a plinth in a corner of the control room in the Dalek City on Skaro, in the story it is destroyed when a civil war breaks out among the Daleks.

The Dalek Emperor was designed by Chris Thompson and built by the BBC Visual Effects Department.

Dalek Supreme
In Planet of the Daleks (1973) the Dalek Supreme, a member of the Dalek Supreme Council, is despatched to the planet Spiridon. It is tasked with overseeing experiments into invisibility, the production of a plague designed to exterminate all organic life and the deployment of a 10,000 strong Dalek invasion force.

The variant was created utilising a prop owned by screenwriter Terry Nation, which had been used in the second Dr. Who film. The neck bin mesh, struts and neck rings were removed, the latter items being replaced by new rings having a flat, recessed edge detailed with small rivets rather than the usual bevel. Lilac dome lights shaped like upturned jam jars were fitted, together with an eyeball resembling a flashlight which lit up when it spoke. It was painted in gloss black with yellow-gold hemispheres, slats, neck rings and dome. It is uncertain who carried out the conversion work, although the painting of the prop was undertaken by the BBC Visual Effects Department under the direction of Clifford Culley.

The ruthlessness of the Dalek Supreme is demonstrated in the story when it destroys the Dalek leader of the Spiridon task force for failing to meet its mission objectives.

Necros Daleks
In Revelation of the Daleks (1985) Davros creates an army of Dalek mutants by manipulating DNA extracted from humans on the planet Necros, where the terminally ill and the dead are being stored in suspended animation. These Necros Daleks are portrayed in the serial as a rebel faction while the grey Daleks from the Dalek home-world of Skaro, seen in the final episode, serve the Supreme Dalek.

In this serial Davros' life-support chair is shown hovering a short distance above the ground. In a later scene a Dalek kills two saboteurs from an elevated vantage point, implying that Daleks now share this capability. For DVD releases of the serial from 2005 onwards new shots were created to clarify that the Dalek is hovering.

Standard Necros Dalek
The Necros Dalek design features detail changes which distinguish it from the standard Mark 3 variant. The skirt angle is steeper at both the front and rear and the hemispheres have a smaller diameter. The shoulder section has only twenty slats, and is broader at the top which, when combined with the skirt, gives it a stockier look. The arm is shorter and the oval between the appendage boxes more elongated. The neck bin strip beneath the lower neck ring is quite distinct in this variant. Necros Daleks are painted light cream with gold hemispheres, shoulder mesh, neck bin mesh, arm and gun.

Glass Dalek
Making a single appearance in Revelation of the Daleks, a Glass Dalek is introduced as a transparent, embryonic version of a Necros Dalek in which a grotesquely mutating human head can be seen. It has four neck rings rather than three. It was manufactured primarily from clear Perspex.

Imperial Daleks

In Remembrance of the Daleks (1988) Davros, masquerading as the Dalek Emperor, has gained control of Skaro. He commands an army of Imperial Daleks, created by grafting bionic appendages onto the bodies of Kaled mutants. The Supreme Dalek and its followers are now referred to by the Imperial Daleks as "renegades".

Imperial Daleks have a similar colour scheme to Necros Daleks, but the designs are otherwise quite distinct from one another. At the direction of BBC visual effects designer Stuart Brisdon, they were realised by the BBC Plastics / Plastering Department using different sets of props created from flexible silicone moulds, enabling both 'hero' props, and lightweight, rigid foam versions for pyrotechnic sequences, to be constructed quickly.

Standard Imperial Dalek
The Imperial Dalek shares a skirt design with the Necros Dalek. In other respects it features many differences when compared with previous variants. It has a stepped fender incorporating a recessed bottom section and integrally moulded collars and slats with no shoulder mesh. There are circular bosses around the appendage ball joints, a hexagonal panel between the appendage boxes, a re-modelled eye and eye discs, a mirrored eye lens with a small gold pupil, flush dome lights and a notched, funnel-like appendage instead of a plunger. The dome has a slightly larger diameter with a sharper angle where the bevelled section meets the curved upper part. The neck bin has a mirrored gold finish and is detailed with a fine circular-section gold mesh overlay, replacing the usual diamond section design. The props are painted predominantly light cream with gold hemisphere, slats, arm, "plunger", gun, eye discs and light covers.

The hovering capability first seen in Revelation of the Daleks is confirmed in Remembrance of the Daleks when an Imperial Dalek is shown levitating up a staircase, emitting a red glow from the base of its casing.

Special Weapons Dalek
The Special Weapons Dalek is a heavily armoured Imperial variant first seen in Remembrance of the Daleks and later in "Asylum of the Daleks" (2012), "The Magician's Apprentice" (2015) and "The Witch's Familiar" (2015). It has no manipulator arm, eye-stalk or dome lights, the latter items being replaced by an encircling row of small, square, translucent ports set around a foreshortened neck section and beneath a truncated dome. In "The Witch's Familiar" the ports are shown to glow with an orange light when the Dalek speaks. It is equipped with a large energy cannon mounted on the front of the casing, which in Remembrance of the Daleks is portrayed completely vaporising two conventional Daleks with a single shot, leaving only scorch marks on the ground. The armour is seen deflecting conventional Dalek weapon fire without suffering damage. Like other Imperial Daleks its livery is white with gold hemispheres, but with a metallic grey colour applied to most of the upper section. The casing appears battle-scarred and far dirtier than other Daleks, which are usually shown in a clean condition.

The BBC Dalek Survival Guide book maintains that this variant's weapon is fifty times more powerful than a regular Dalek blaster. It notes that Special Weapons Daleks are almost always directly controlled by Dalek commanders and rarely allowed autonomy, except in desperate situations, as they are as likely to fire on fellow Daleks as the enemy.

In Ben Aaronovitch's novelisation of Remembrance it is stated that the enormous power source required for the Special Weapons Dalek's gun resulted in the release of high levels of radiation which altered the structure of the Dalek creature's brain, causing insanity. Consequently, other Daleks shun it, ironically for being a mutant, naming it "the Abomination". The novel states that the Special Weapons Dalek is used only in extreme situations and only the Emperor can maintain complete control over it. The Special Weapons Dalek is also mentioned in the novel War of the Daleks. and the Big Finish audio production The Genocide Machine. See also The Dark Dimension Dalek.

Imperial Dalek Emperor 

The Emperor of the Imperial Dalek faction features in Remembrance of the Daleks. During the serial it is revealed that it contains the Kaled Davros, rather than a Dalek mutant. With only his head and partial torso visible, he is carried in a life support casing similar in design to the TV21 comic version of the Dalek Emperor. The travel machine has no appendages. A translucent hexagonal panel is located centrally on the front of the dome, in a position approximating that where an eye stalk would be mounted on a standard Dalek casing. A strip-light is mounted vertically behind it, which scans from side to side when the Emperor speaks. The front upper section of the dome is shown to operate like a visor, retracting upward and to the rear to reveal Davros within.

Renegade Daleks
In Remembrance of the Daleks (1988) the Imperial Daleks are opposed by "Renegade Daleks". Most of the Renegades seen in the serial are of the Necros Dalek design but with the prominent neck bin strip below the lower neck ring removed. The shoulder mesh is also coarser than that previously seen, resembling a perforated, solid material. Renegade drones are painted grey with a black fender, hemispheres, collars, slats and appendages. A Renegade Supreme Dalek also appears, being a BBC promotional prop made by Martin Wilkie and Lorne Martin. It too is primarily based on the Necros design but with a different collar, slat, mesh and neck bin arrangement. It is further differentiated by having a small eyeball and orange dome lights and appears in a black paint scheme with silver neck rings, neck struts, hemispheres, collars, mesh and slats.

Remembrance of the Daleks was the Daleks' last appearance in the "classic" Doctor Who series, with the programme being put on hiatus by the BBC after December 1989.

"New Series" Daleks
After a break of fifteen years from regular production (there was a 1996 Doctor Who television movie in which the Daleks were heard but not seen), Doctor Who returned to British television in March 2005. The sixth episode of the "new series" first season, "Dalek", featured a lone Dalek, the survivor of a Time War which had ended in the mutual annihilation of both the Daleks and the Doctor's race, the Time Lords. While the "New Series" Dalek retains the same basic shape and proportions of its forebears, almost every component has been re-designed to give it a more solid look. The updated appearance was the result of input from Doctor Who executive producer Russell T Davies, artist Bryan Hitch and production designer Edward Thomas, with the design being realised by art department assistant designer Matthew Savage.
The first batch of "New Series" Dalek props were constructed by special effects company The Model Unit under the direction of Mike Tucker, with later builds being undertaken by Specialist Models, 'propmaker.co.uk' and Rubbertoe Props.

Standard Dalek
The standard "New Series" Dalek design incorporates additional detailing to many of the components including the dome, gun, appendage boxes, plunger and eyeball. The fender is larger with a bevelled edge, the lower collar is integral to the casing and the upper collar and mesh are omitted, being replaced by a raised shoulder section beneath the neck bin. The slats have an indented central channel running down their length and the neck bin mesh has a denser, more complex design. The dome lights are substantially larger and enclosed in metal cages and the eye stalk pivot is surrounded by a cowl, below which is a horizontal oblong depression containing an ideogram unique to each Dalek. The standard "New Series" Dalek is finished in a metallic bronze colour scheme.

This Dalek design exhibits previously unseen abilities, many of which are realised using computer-generated imagery. The casing has a swivelling midsection incorporating the appendage boxes, providing a 360-degree field of fire. It can also open by splitting down the front centreline to reveal the mutant within. In "Dalek" (2005) the hemispheres are shown to be recessed spheres and components of a self-destruct mechanism. They are able to separate from the Dalek's casing and create an encircling sphere of energy within which the Dalek is destroyed without trace. The plunger has been transformed into a versatile tool with an adaptable shape which can interface with keyboards and control mechanisms, upload data, drain power and crush a man's skull.

"New Series" Daleks have been shown flying both in the vacuum of space and planetary atmospheres. They can regenerate by absorbing residual radiation and DNA from a time-traveller who touches them ("Doomsday" (2006)) and have a force field which can disintegrate bullets before they strike the casing. The height of the new design was chosen so that the eye stalk would be level with the eyes of the Doctor's companion Rose Tyler, as portrayed by actress Billie Piper.

Three minor variations to the standard "new series" design have been shown. The single Dalek seen in "Dalek" differs from those appearing in subsequent episodes in that the lower shoulder collar is the same brass colour as its slats, instead of being bronze. A Dalek is seen in "The Parting of the Ways" (2005) with its plunger replaced by a spherical appendage incorporating a three-pincer claw and an extendable cutting torch. The story shows it being used by the Dalek force invading the Satellite 5 space station to breach an internal blast door. The toy manufacturer Character Options has used the term "Assault Dalek" on promotional material and packaging for licensed scale Dalek action figures having the claw/cutter appendage. The episode "Victory of the Daleks" (2010), set during World War II, features two "New Series" Daleks masquerading as British secret weapons. Their casings are painted in camouflage green with a Union Jack replacing the identifying ideogram on the dome front. Canvas ammunition pouches are fixed around the shoulders and in one scene a Dalek is shown operating outdoors with opaque fabric covers fitted over its dome lights. The Daleks are also seen carrying a tea tray and box files with their plungers angled upward, an ability not previously demonstrated. These Daleks are referred to as "Ironsides" in the story.

Emperor's personal guard

Repeating the motif first seen in 1967 serial The Evil of the Daleks, a number of black-domed Daleks appear briefly in "The Parting of the Ways", forming a guard around the Dalek Emperor. Some of the guards are also differentiated by the replacement of the standard plunger with a metallic sphere, on the front of which is a glowing lens. In some instances the sphere is held by blade-like projections while the support for a second, larger type is provided by a tubular framework. These specialised appendages are not referred to or shown in use during the episode, nor is their purpose explained. Both the BBC's Doctor Who website and the publication Doctor Who: Aliens and Enemies describe them as weapons. The packaging for the Character Options 12" radio control model of the Emperor's Guard variant identifies the device as a "multiple spectrum sensor arm".

Emperor Dalek 
An Emperor Dalek features in the 2005 series finale "The Parting of the Ways". Escaping the Time War which resulted in the apparent destruction of both the Daleks and Time Lords alike, its ship had fallen through time and space to the edge of Earth's Solar System. Having then recreated the Dalek race this Emperor regards itself as an immortal god and the Daleks worship it as such. The Emperor Dalek mutant floats in a transparent cylindrical tank below a large dome which is adorned with lights and an eyestalk. Two mechanical arms are mounted to the base of the tank. The central structure is connected by articulated joints to three flanking panels, to which large hemispheres are attached.

Doctor Who production designer Edward Thomas was responsible for the overall appearance of the Emperor Dalek, with the design being realised by assistant designers Dan Walker and Matthew Savage. The Emperor's casing was produced as a 1:6 scale model by The Model Unit, while the Emperor Dalek mutant was an animatronic puppet, again in 1:6 scale, created by visual effects specialist Neill Gorton.

Cult of Skaro

The Cult of Skaro is introduced in "Army of Ghosts" (2006) as an elite order of Daleks specifically engineered to use initiative and think like the enemy. They are the first recurring Dalek characters in the history of the Doctor Who television programme. Unlike other Daleks the four members of the Cult have individual names; Sec, Thay, Jast and Caan. While Daleks Thay, Jast and Caan appear identical to other Daleks, Dalek Sec is distinguished by a black casing.

The Cult are shown to possess a sense of individuality and the ability to initiate an "emergency temporal shift" to escape danger by travelling through time and space. In "Doomsday" a combination of three plungers are used to extract information from a person's mind with lethal results (although it is implied that this can be done without killing the victim). In the episode "Daleks in Manhattan" (2007) the plungers of the Cult of Skaro Daleks are used to detect the intelligence of human subjects, and in one scene a plunger is temporarily replaced by a syringe-like device. The BBC book Doctor Who Files: The Cult of Skaro  states that Dalek Sec's black casing is constructed from "Metalert", an enhanced form of Dalekanium reinforced with flidor gold and sap from the extinct Arkellis flower. This fictional material and its constituents have their origins in the TV Century 21 Dalek comic strip from 1965, where they are mentioned in the stories Duel of the Daleks and Genesis of Evil.

Vault Daleks
Appearing in the linked episodes "The Stolen Earth" (2008) and "Journey's End" (2008), Vault Daleks watch over Davros in the Vault of The Crucible space station, acting as both bodyguards and warders. Although unnamed during the episodes in which they appear, the term is used for the variant on the BBC's Doctor Who website. Character Options named its licensed scale toys of the variant "Crucible Daleks".

Vault Daleks form part of the recreated Dalek race each of which, Davros states, has been genetically engineered with cells taken from his own body. Instead of the standard plunger they are fitted with a claw-like appendage incorporating eight "pincers", which are shown to fit directly into some of the ship's controls.

Death Squad Daleks
In the episode "Revolution of the Daleks", Death Squad Daleks are introduced. According to the episode's narrative, they are enforcers of the Dalek race's purity through the destruction of any Daleks which are considered to be genetically corrupt. These Daleks are visually distinguished by having their plunger replaced by a five-pincered claw, similar in design to that fitted to Reconnaissance Scout Daleks and Defence Drone Daleks.

Executioner Daleks
New Series Dalek variants equipped with a five-pincered claw manipulator appendage and a multi-barrelled Gatling gun-style energy weapon appear in the 2022 New Year’s Day special episode "Eve of the Daleks". Their stated mission is to execute special targets, including the Doctor.

Supreme Dalek

A Supreme Dalek appears in "The Stolen Earth" and "Journey's End" (2008), and "The Magician's Apprentice" and "The Witch's Familiar" (2015) as leader of the Dalek forces, outranking even Davros. This variant is a radical departure from the standard "New Series" design. It is painted red with gold hemispheres, collar and neck rings. It has three plinth-mounted dome lights featuring cages with three, rather than four uprights, and large golden struts connecting its shoulders to an extended neck bin. Its voice is deeper than the other Daleks, resembling that of the 2005 series' Dalek Emperor. Nicholas Briggs, who provided the voice talent for the Dalek, stated that he adopted a grandiose delivery for the Supreme Dalek to fit his perception of the character as being egotistical.

The Supreme Dalek was designed by Doctor Who production designer Edward Thomas, realised by design assistant Peter McKinstry and created by propmaker.co.uk.

New Paradigm Daleks
In "Victory of the Daleks" (2010) five examples of a new Dalek variant are introduced, described in the narrative as forming "a new Dalek paradigm". They are created from pure Dalek DNA contained in a device called a "Progenitor". Their design is the result of input from Doctor Who executive producer Steven Moffat, production designer Edward Thomas, "Victory of the Daleks" writer Mark Gatiss and concept artist Peter McKinstry. The props were produced by the BBC Art Department under the supervision of senior prop maker Barry Jones.

Each of the five New Paradigm variants has a casing of a different colour, representing their role in Dalek society: red, Drone; blue, Strategist; orange, Scientist; yellow, Eternal and white, Supreme. Speaking on the programme Doctor Who Confidential, Doctor Who Executive Producer Steven Moffat stated that the function of the Eternal Dalek had yet to be decided, while writer Mark Gatiss confirmed that the bright colours of the New Paradigm Daleks were inspired by the Daleks seen in the 1960s Amicus films.

New Paradigm Daleks are taller than previous variants, having a substantial fender reminiscent of Movie Daleks. The skirt section consists of raised panels with bevelled edges to which forty-eight hemispheres are fixed in twelve columns. The hemispheres are coloured grey with the exception of the Eternal Dalek, where they are black. The central rear skirt panel is enlarged to form a broad spine featuring a recessed horizontal louvre assembly. Published design drawings and commentary by concept artist Peter McKinstry indicates that this section is capable of opening to deploy alternative weapons which would traverse around the midsection to replace the standard armament, although this has not been portrayed on screen. The skirt is surmounted by a prominent, slatless shoulder section, divided by a horizontal groove and featuring integral appendage boxes. The neck is devoid of struts and consists of four flared rings detailed with small vertical slots, and is mounted towards the front of the Dalek giving the appearance of a prominent hump to the rear shoulder section. The dome, to which two cylindrical lights are fitted, is missing the chamfered lower section applied to previous variants. The gun is larger than that previously seen on the programme and is shown causing the complete disintegration of another Dalek. The eye design features five closely spaced discs of identical diameter behind an eyeball, inset with horizontal fins, on the front of which is a veined "organic" lens which glows with a yellow light. It is mounted to the dome on a ball joint.

Two variations on the New Paradigm design have been shown. The Series 5 finale "The Big Bang" features a pair of fossilised New Paradigm 'Stone Daleks' having the appearance of severely weathered statues. They are remnants left when, in the episode, most of history is erased by the destruction of the universe. The term Stone Dalek is derived from a listing in the episode credits. In the Series 7 episode "Asylum of the Daleks" red Drone and blue Strategist Daleks are shown with their original bright colour schemes replaced by a deeper, metallic hue. The rear of the props are also seen with minor modifications, rendering the spine slightly less prominent.

The design of the New Paradigm Daleks proved to be controversial and failed to generate much enthusiasm among fans of the TV series. In 2015, commenting on the introduction of the New Paradigm, Moffat said "Well I suppose if I'm completely honest - and it's all my fault, no one else's fault - I don't think that was a great idea. When I looked at them in person I thought 'My God, the new Daleks are awesome. they're so huge and powerful, they're brilliant.' But I learned a grave lesson: which is that when you put them on screen, of course, they don't look bigger, they just make all the other Daleks look smaller." Moffat stated that the New Paradigm Daleks hadn't been abandoned, however. "...I now consider them an officer class of Dalek." "They haven't gone away. We still have them. But that's the answer. The answer to most questions I find is that I've made a mistake."

Reconnaissance Scout Daleks
Appearing in the 2019 episode "Resolution", Reconnaissance Scout Daleks are described as being the first of their kind to leave the Dalek home planet, Skaro, and as possessing abilities not present in other Daleks. The original design of the Reconnaissance Scout travel machine is not established as, in the story, the casing of the individual that visited Earth was destroyed 900 years before the time in which the episode is set. A replacement that it fabricates from scrap components incorporates some simplified bronze New Series Dalek design elements (including fewer, but larger hemispheres) while introducing augmented weaponry in the form of six small missiles housed behind the front two columns of skirt hemispheres.

The Reconnaissance Scout Dalek mutant shown in the episode resembles a grey-green octopus-like being, which can attach itself to the back of, and control, a human host. In the narrative, it was hacked into three pieces which were then buried thousands of miles apart. The creature did not die, however, but became dormant for centuries. When one of the pieces is uncovered and exposed to ultra-violet light, the mutant is able to gather the other pieces by teleportation and reassemble itself.

Defence Drone Daleks
In the 2020 episode "Revolution of the Daleks", an industrialist has one of his scientists create advanced robotic defence drones based upon the stolen remains of the Reconnaissance Scout Dalek casing, seen in the episode "Resolution" (see above). Unaware that the casing once contained a living creature, and discovering organic cells inside it, the scientist clones them and inadvertently creates an imperfect copy of the Reconnaissance Scout Dalek mutant. The mutant then seizes control of the scientist and forces him to make further copies of itself to inhabit the drone casings, to exterminate all human life and take over the planet.
   
The Defence Drone casings shown in the episode are similar in design to the Reconnaissance Scout Dalek's replacement travel machine, but with a predominantly black colour scheme and cleaner lines.

Dalek hybrids
Hybridisation between Daleks and other species has been a recurring theme in the Doctor Who television programme since the 1960s.

Physical Hybrids
In Revelation of the Daleks (1985) Davros creates a new breed of Dalek mutants to command. He uses as source material the severed heads of terminal human medical patients in the Tranquil Repose mausoleum and suspended animation facility on the planet Necros. During the early stages of the conversion process the victims retain some memory and awareness of their humanity, but by the end of the metamorphosis they have become fully Dalek in nature, if not appearance.

In "Dalek" (2005) a dying Dalek's casing is touched by Rose Tyler, a companion of the Doctor. During this brief physical contact the Dalek absorbs enough of her DNA to regenerate itself and its damaged travel machine. It later becomes apparent that this genetic material has caused it to mutate further, as it begins to experience human emotions. It finally becomes trapped in an agony of conflict and self-loathing, and destroys itself.
	
In "The Parting of the Ways" (2005) the Emperor Dalek and the few surviving members of its crew hide in space for centuries after the Time War, harvesting organic material from captured humans and genetically manipulating it to rebuild their race. The Emperor tells the Doctor that a new Dalek army has been created using "filleted, pulped and sifted" human bodies, although they still consider themselves to be "...pure and blessed Dalek". When a Dalek is destroyed and the mutant revealed it is of a different appearance to the mutant seen in "Dalek", the prop hinting at a human heritage. Mutants originating from Kaled stock appear to have a closed, vestigial second eye, set below and to one side of the sighted eye. The mutant in "The Parting of the Ways" seems to have two identical symmetrically set eyes above which is a prominent supraorbital ridge. A large fleshy mass protrudes below the eyes, with folds suggestive of a mouth-like orifice.

In the two-part story "Daleks in Manhattan" and "Evolution of the Daleks" (2007) the Cult of Skaro, stranded in 1930s America following an emergency temporal shift, attempt to rebuild the Dalek race. Their leader, Dalek Sec, traps in its casing Mr. Diagoras, a human collaborator, and merges with him to become a Human/Dalek hybrid. The process results in a mutated humanoid creature with fingers tapered to points, a large, exposed brain and a single eye set in a face framed by six thick tentacles. The voice is an amalgam of human and Dalek characteristics. Sec then orders that hybrids should be created having human bodies and emotions, coupled with Dalek intelligence, to eradicate the Daleks' obsession with universal supremacy which has led them to the brink of extinction. Believing that Daleks should remain pure and Sec is now a traitor to their race, the other Cult members bind it in chains and adjust the conversion process to produce hybrids which are completely Dalek in nature. Sec is killed preventing Cult member Dalek Thay from exterminating the Doctor.

The episode "Asylum of the Daleks" (2012) introduces the Dalek planet Asylum where a young woman, Oswin Oswald, has become trapped following a spaceship crash. A nanogene cloud, designed to convert all other life forms to serve the planet's security system, completely transforms her into a Dalek to preserve her genius-level intellect for Dalek use. Oswin is initially unaware of her condition, having created the self-delusion of continuing humanity to protect herself from the horror of her situation. Ultimately she is able to overcome her re-emergent Dalek personality and assist the Doctor and his companions to escape the planet. She perishes when the Daleks destroy the Asylum from space.

Mental Hybrids
In The Evil of the Daleks (1967) the Daleks trap the Doctor into identifying the "Dalek Factor", which determines their species' unquestioning obedience to Dalek ideology and aggressive, pitiless nature. With the aid of a "converted" Doctor they plan to impregnate all of humanity throughout Earth's history with the Dalek Factor, transforming them into "Human Daleks". When, in the story, some Daleks are implanted with the "Human Factor" they lose their aggressive traits and begin to question authority, leading to a catastrophic civil war.

In the two-part story "Daleks in Manhattan" and "Evolution of the Daleks" (2007) the Cult of Skaro attempt to rebuild the Dalek race using Human-Dalek DNA to "format" the brains of thousands of captured people who have had their minds erased. The scheme fails due to the contamination of the Human Daleks with the Doctor's DNA, causing them to question their orders and Dalek ideology. After two of the Cult members are destroyed by the Human Daleks during a fire-fight, the remaining Dalek, Caan, declares the hybrids to be a failure and transmits a destruct signal, killing them.

In "The Witch's Familiar" (2015), Davros attempts to use the Doctor's regeneration energy to transform every Dalek on Skaro into Dalek-Time Lord hybrids. The plan fails when the rotting remains of aged Daleks, which have been discarded in the sewers of the Dalek city, are reanimated by the energy and attack the functional Daleks in revenge.

Dalek "Puppets"
Dalek "puppets" are portrayed as life forms converted to serve the Daleks, often covertly. They retain their original, physical form and limited memories from the host, while being endowed with extendable Dalek appendages which are deployed by bursting outward through the skin. Dalek control of the puppets is usually absolute, although a few individual examples have been depicted breaking their mental conditioning and regaining their free will.
	
First appearing in "Asylum of the Daleks" (2012), humanoids are stated to have been converted to Dalek puppets by nanogenes to act as part of the planet Asylum's security system. In the novel The Dalek Generation (2013), a child, Jenibeth Blakely, is held prisoner by the Daleks for almost ninety years, during which time she is transformed into a Dalek puppet. Hybrids of this type next appear in the episode "The Time of the Doctor" (2013), where the crew of the spacecraft Church of the Papal Mainframe are killed by the Daleks during the battle for the planet Trenzalore and turned into Dalek puppets. In "The Magician's Apprentice" (2015), Bors, a human friend of the Doctor from the year 1138, is revealed to be a Dalek puppet tasked by his masters with obtaining the TARDIS.

Dalek variants in films
Capitalising on the wave of "Dalekmania" gripping Britain following their initial appearances in the Doctor Who programme, two films featuring the Daleks were produced: Dr. Who and the Daleks (1965) and Daleks' Invasion Earth 2150 A.D. (1966). The storylines for these movies are essentially identical to the first two TV serials in which the Daleks were seen, with the primary exception that the protagonist is portrayed as an eccentric human inventor with the surname "Who" rather than an alien. Consequently, these Dalek appearances and variants exist in a continuity unique to the film series.

Mark 1 Movie Daleks
First appearing in the film Dr. Who and the Daleks, Movie Daleks have substantial fenders, very similar in shape and design to those seen in the Doctor Who serial The Dalek Invasion of Earth. The skirt sits directly on top of the enlarged fender, however, without the intervening step created by the original TV variant base. The appendage boxes are angled slightly differently and the neck ring edges have a steeper bevel. The eyestalk has only five discs, most irises are illuminated and the dome lights are considerably larger than those seen on TV Daleks of the period. Another distinctive design feature is the gun, which has a wider bore than the TV counterpart, lacks mantles and is depicted as projecting a pressurised jet of destructive, lethal vapour rather than an energy discharge.

Three minor Dalek variants appear in the film. Some Daleks are fitted with a two-jawed mechanical claw instead of a plunger, some have integrally moulded collars with reversed angles on the front edges and one is seen with a cutting torch instead of a telescopic arm.

While hemisphere misalignment is an occasionally recurring feature of Daleks seen on television, this issue presents itself in a uniform manner with all of the film props. Most noticeably the four hemispheres on the rear-left corner skirt panel are set higher than those on the other panels.

For their first film appearance the Dalek props were painted in bold colours. Drones are primarily silver with mid-blue domes, hemispheres and fenders, and gold collars. The Dalek leader is black with alternating silver and gold hemispheres, alternating silver and gold neck rings, and gold collars and fender. Its second in command is portrayed as a red Dalek with black hemispheres, gold collars and a gold fender. On all versions the dome lights are coloured red.

The hero props seen in the film were constructed by Shawcraft Engineering while the Daleks with integrally moulded shoulder collars, which were mainly used to make up numbers in crowd scenes, were produced by the Plaster Workshops at Shepperton Studios.

Three Mark 1 Movie Dalek props can occasionally be seen in the Doctor Who television serial The Chase, hired from AARU, the production company responsible for the Dr. Who films, to increase numbers. In some scenes their large fenders are missing, with the skirts sitting directly on the floor, and the large dome lights replaced with smaller items as used for the TV props. Their more striking colour scheme is not readily apparent due to the filming of the serial in monochrome. As the film was not released until after The Chase was screened, this television appearance is the first occasion that the film props were seen by the public.

Mark 2 Movie Daleks
The Dalek variant seen in the film Daleks' Invasion Earth 2150 A.D. is similar in design to the Mark 1 version but with the addition of the upper collar mesh and slats with which the TV versions were by now equipped. At various points in the film a Dalek can be seen with a small silver plunger in place of the usual black item. Another features a scissor-like claw instead of the standard "G-clamp"-shaped device and a gun with mantles. These unusual appendages are not referred to in the story. The misalignment of the hemispheres, evident in Dr. Who and the Daleks, is once again present.

The colour scheme for the drones used in the second film is essentially the same as that used for the television versions at the time, being silver with grey shoulders, natural aluminium collars and slats, blue hemispheres and a black fender. The narrative fails to establish a precise hierarchy for the Dalek commanders seen in the film. The leader of the expeditionary force appears to be a gold Dalek with natural aluminium collars and slats, black hemispheres and a black fender. A black Dalek with gold hemispheres, natural aluminium collars and slats and a black fender is in charge of a mining operation in Bedfordshire, while a red Dalek with natural aluminium collars and slats and a black fender with red topping is shown commanding a Dalek spaceship and operations to capture human slaves and wipe-out the resistance. Drones sport blue dome lights, the black and red Daleks have red dome lights and the gold Dalek has yellow dome lights. As for the first film, the Dalek props were constructed by Shawcraft Engineering.

Dalek variants in the theatre
Daleks with unique characteristics have appeared in stage productions consisting of both original works and adaptations of serials from the Doctor Who television programme. In addition to the professional productions detailed below a number of amateur presentations have been staged. These include Doctor Who and the Daleks in the Seven Keys to Doomsday (Porirua Little Theatre, Titahi Bay, Porirua, New Zealand, 1984), The Evil of the Daleks (New Theatre Royal, Portsmouth, England, 2006) and The Daleks' Master Plan (New Theatre Royal, Portsmouth, England, 2007).

The Curse of the Daleks (1965)
The Curse of the Daleks was a stage play written by David Whitaker and Terry Nation which appeared for one month at the Wyndham's Theatre in London, England beginning on 21 December 1965.

Five Daleks were used in the production; four silver/grey drones and a black version. Built by Shawcraft, the manufacturers of the original TV and Movie props, they were of the basic Mark 1 Movie Dalek design but with fenders, dome lights and guns of the type seen on TV Daleks at the time.

Doctor Who and the Daleks in the Seven Keys to Doomsday (1974)
Doctor Who and the Daleks in the Seven Keys to Doomsday was a stage play written by Terrance Dicks which ran at the Adelphi Theatre in London, England, for four weeks beginning on 16 December 1974.

Five Daleks were created for the play by Philip Poole and Phillip Alleston under the guidance of model maker, sculptor and film designer Allister Bowtell. They were of a similar design to the Supreme Dalek from Planet of the Daleks, having flat-edged neck rings, a strutless neck bin and an enlarged fender. Turn-indicator style lights were used, with the gun stick rods being thinner and more angular than those fitted to either the TV or film variants.

Contemporary publicity photographs show Trevor Martin, the actor portraying Doctor Who in the play, posing with the Planet of the Daleks Supreme and a Mark 2 Movie Dalek, with the latter prop displaying various alterations to its dome lights and appendages. Neither of these props actually appeared in the stage production.

The Ultimate Adventure (1989)
Doctor Who – The Ultimate Adventure was a stage play written by Terrance Dicks. It toured Great Britain, appearing at twenty theatres between April and August 1989.

Four blue/grey drones and a Black Dalek (credited as "The Chief Dalek") appeared in the play. Specific design differences from the television version of the time included a skirt section flared more to the sides and less to the front and rear, a single vertical column of hemispheres on the skirt side panels and a higher fender. The props had large, rectangular dome lights, a bottom neck ring which protruded beyond the shoulder line, and lacked both eye discs and slats. These Daleks also featured a dome that was a true hemisphere rather than the usual bevelled design and a single, oblong appendage box running across the front of the body.

A Dalek Emperor prop was also created, being a scaled-down but otherwise faithful reproduction of the version that appeared in The Evil of the Daleks with the addition of large wing-like structures to the sides. The Dalek props used in the production were built by the theatrical suppliers Suffolk Scenery.

Dalek variants in comics, books, audio dramas and video games
Various writers and artists have created new Dalek variants for media other than television, film and the theatre. The depiction of Daleks with coloured casings has also been used to indicate rank, although these differentiations do not constitute separate variants as such. Of particular note in this respect is John Peel's BBC Books Doctor Who novel War of the Daleks in which grey, blue, red, black and gold Daleks are described as having successively higher status, all serving under the Dalek Prime. Other examples are the TV21 Dalek comic strip in which a Black Dalek is shown acting as second-in-command to the Golden Emperor, and Trevor Baxendale's novel Prisoner of the Daleks where a Dalek Inquisitor General is described as being of the "New Series" design but having a casing of gunmetal black with gold slats and hemispheres.

Golden Emperor Dalek
The concept of an Emperor Dalek was first introduced in The Dalek Book (1964), re-appearing shortly thereafter in the TV21 comic strip The Daleks (1965–1967).

In the comic strip version of events the planet Skaro was inhabited by two warring humanoid species; the tall, peaceful Thals and the aggressive blue-skinned Daleks. The Daleks build a neutron bomb to finally destroy the Thals and bring the conflict to an end. A meteorite storm causes the device to detonate prematurely, devastating Skaro and the planet's civilisations. The only survivors of the Dalek race are the scientist Yarvelling and the warlord Zolfian. While exploring the shattered remains of their world they are attacked, and then interrogated, by a prototype war machine which Yarvelling had created shortly before the holocaust. It is implied that these machines were intended to act as semi-autonomous robotic warriors. It informs them that it is actually a mutated Dalek, the result of radiation from the neutron bomb explosion, which has commandeered the casing to use as a travel machine. It says that there are many more mutants and persuades Yarvelling and Zolfian to build more casings to house them. Before the last two humanoid Daleks die, exhausted by their labours and the effects of radiation, it appoints itself as Emperor and has a special casing constructed to reflect its new rank, made from "...Flidor gold, Quartz and Arkellis flower sap...". The Golden Emperor is usually depicted as being slightly shorter than a standard Dalek with a disproportionately large spherical head section.

The title page of The Dalek Book lists three contributing illustrators; Richard Jennings, John Woods and A.B. Cornwell. As none of the stories are individually credited it is uncertain which artist or artists first developed the Golden Emperor design. Two illustrators provided interpretations of the Golden Emperor for the TV21 comic strip; Jennings again, and Ron Turner who superseded him in later instalments.

"The Dalek Book" Daleks
The Dalek Book (1964) is notable, although not unique, in portraying a Dalek variant which has a "speaker grille" set centrally on the chest and, occasionally, a stylised numeral on the dome. Neither of these items has ever been incorporated in a Dalek variant shown on-screen.

During rehearsals for the first Doctor Who serial in which they appeared a numbered piece of card was taped to the dome of each Dalek prop to assist the director in distinguishing them, with a tape roll being wedged behind the top front collar for safekeeping. These objects subsequently appeared in reference photographs of the Daleks provided by the BBC to merchandise producers, with the illustrators of The Dalek Book interpreting them as speaker grilles and insignia. Shortly after the publication of this volume other merchandise and packaging appeared featuring Daleks with the speaker grille design element. These included Dalek board games, bagatelle, "Cutta-Mastic" polystyrene sculpting sets, marble mazes and a ray gun torch.

Dalek Emperor
A Dalek Emperor, described as being similar that seen in The Evil of the Daleks, appears in the Telos novella The Dalek Factor (2004) by Simon Clark. It is referred to as "an Emperor", implying there is more than one during the period in which the story is set.

Dalek Prime
A Dalek Prime is referred to in several of the novels based on Doctor Who serials (The Chase, The Daleks' Master Plan, The Power of the Daleks, The Evil of the Daleks). It is also mentioned in John Peel's Eighth Doctor novels, War of the Daleks (1997) and Legacy of the Daleks (1998). Although portrayed as being a leader its precise position in the Dalek hierarchy is not made clear. In War of the Daleks its description closely matches that of the TV21 Golden Emperor.

Dalek Time Controller
The Time Controller Dalek features in the Big Finish Productions Doctor Who audio dramas Patient Zero (2009), Lucie Miller (2011), To the Death (2011), Dark Eyes (2012), Dark Eyes 2 (2014), Dark Eyes 4 (2015) and the novel The Dalek Generation (2013). It is portrayed as being genetically engineered to have an enhanced perception of the space-time vortex, enabling it to direct Dalek strategies involving time travel while limiting temporal destabilisation. Cover art and promotional illustrations depict the Dalek Time Controller with a purple casing of the Mark 3 design, with an extended neck bin and additional, diagonal neck rings. The novel describes it as the ultimate form of Dalek life, able to command even the Supreme Dalek, and having a neck bin encircled by diagonally revolving rings of vortex energy. The Dalek Time Controller is voiced in the audio productions by actor Nicholas Briggs.

Dalek Time Strategist
The Dalek Time Strategist is portrayed as having similar abilities to the Dalek Time Controller, while being subservient to the Supreme Dalek. It first appears in the Big Finish Dark Eyes 4 2015 audio drama episodes The Monster of Montmartre and Master of the Daleks, and subsequently features in other episodes of the Big Finish audio dramas The War Doctor 3, The War Doctor 4, Gallifrey 9 : Time War Volume 1 and The Eighth Doctor: The Time War 3. The Dalek Time Strategist is voiced in the audio productions by actor Nicholas Briggs.

Cover art and promotional illustrations depict the Dalek Time Strategist with a purple casing of the New Series Supreme Dalek design, with an extended neck bin containing a glowing "plasma ball" and additional, diagonal neck rings.

"Hayakawa" Daleks

Four of the Target Books Doctor Who serial novelisations were translated into Japanese by Yukio Sekiguchi and published in 1980 by Hayakawa Bunko books.

Unlike other comic book and graphic artists whose work, however stylised, usually presents relatively minor variations to the standard Dalek form, Sato's renderings show a unique Dalek variant which is a radical departure from the recognised design. Possible reasons for this include lack of access to source material, the Japanese publishers having no rights to the use of the Dalek image and the artist simply being allowed the free rein of his imagination.

Marine Daleks
Marine Daleks, introduced in the novel War of the Daleks (1997), are torpedo-shaped with their eye at the front and have a gun stick and grappling arm parallel to their body. They are stated to be larger than standard Daleks.

Marsh Daleks

The 1964 The Dalek Book story The Monsters of Gurnian, written by Terry Nation and David Whittaker, features bipedal Marsh Daleks which are used to keep in check the Horrorkons; two headed plesiosaur-like creatures which inhabit the swamps of the planet Gurnian. As none of the stories or artwork in the book are individually credited it is unknown which of the contributing artists developed the Marsh Dalek design. Marsh Daleks are also referenced briefly in Marc Platt's Doctor Who novel Lungbarrow (1997), in which it is said that during the 26th century humans fought and disabled them by shooting at their legs with high-impulse carbines.

Predator Dalek
The Predator Dalek features in the Doctor Who novel Engines of War (2014), written by George Mann. It is stated to be a prototype created to make a perfect Dalek during The Last Great Time War. This is to be accomplished by capturing the War Doctor, removing his memory and emotions to leave only his creativity, and then integrating him with its technology. It is described as being of the standard "New Series" Dalek design but twice as large, with a deep, metallic vermillion skirt and black hemispheres.

Psyche Daleks
Appearing briefly in the comic strip Emperor of the Daleks (1993), written by John Freeman and Paul Cornell, Psyche Daleks are depicted with a large mass of green brain tissue contained within a transparent sphere that sits on top of the shoulder section in place of the normal neck bin and dome. In the story a Psyche Dalek is used to control a small group of partially robotised prisoners through a remote device mounted on its arm in place of a plunger. The comic strip was drawn by Lee Sullivan.

Scout Daleks
In Ben Aaronovitch's novelisation of Remembrance of the Daleks (1990) the Imperial Dalek faction use Scout Daleks which are described as being more powerful and streamlined than standard Daleks.

Spider Daleks
Spider Daleks were a variant proposed by John Leekley for an aborted Doctor Who television movie to be produced by Amblin Entertainment in 1994. Spider Daleks directly based on the Amblin production concept sketches were eventually used in the comic strip Fire and Brimstone (1997) in which they are presented as a radically different form of Dalek from a parallel universe. The strip was drawn by Martin Geraghty and Robin Smith. In John Peel's novel War of the Daleks (1997) they are depicted as creations of Davros and described as being slightly larger than a standard Dalek, with eight legs emerging from the lower half. They are said to have greater manoeuvrability than standard Daleks, at the cost of being more vulnerable at their joints.

Strider Daleks
Giant versions of the Spider Dalek, known as Striders, are mentioned in John Peel's novel War of the Daleks (1997). They are said to be ten times larger than a standard Spider Dalek and equipped with additional weapons.

Klade
The Klade are a people from the distant future in Lance Parkin's BBC Eighth Doctor novel Father Time (2001) and the Miranda spin-off comics (2003). Although physically humanoid they share many cultural characteristics with the Daleks and appear to regard Dalek history as their own. Their name is both an anagram of "Dalek", as "Dalek" is itself of "Kaled" and a play on the biological term "clade", being a group of species sharing a common ancestor. They are "...the super-evolved descendants of the Daleks", the implication being that, like the Thals, their mutation has come "full circle" and returned them to a humanoid form.

Skaro Degradations
The Skaro Degradations are first mentioned in the Doctor Who television serial "The End of Time" (2009), where the Tenth Doctor says they were one of the horrors of The Last Great Time War. They later appear in the War Doctor novel Engines of War (2014) by George Mann, described as being unstable and unpredictable abominations created by Dalek experiments to retro-evolve their own genome. Three types are mentioned in the book. Glider Degradations travel by hovering above the ground. The Dalek mutant is housed in a clear, reinforced compartment set beneath a standard Dalek dome and resembles a limbless, humanoid torso. Mechanical arms and energy weapons are located on both sides of the casing. Spider Degradations are egg-shaped with red and black hemispheres, move on three legs and are armed with four energy weapons. Temporal Weapon Degradations are similar to Special Weapons Daleks and equipped with a temporal cannon capable of erasing its victims from history.

Alternate timeline Daleks
Daleks from an alternate timeline appear in the E-book The Ripple Effect (2013) by Malorie Blackman. The alternate Daleks are portrayed as a civilised, philosophical, peace-loving race, speaking with quiet, modulated voices and having individual names. Most of the alternate Daleks have two manipulator arms and no weapon, with only those defending Skaro from space being armed. Ultimately the Doctor discovers that the alternate timeline is unstable, causing the Universe to decay. Travelling back in time he restores the original timeline, erasing the alternate Daleks from existence.

Stained Glass Daleks
Stained Glass Daleks feature in the Big Finish Productions Doctor Who audio drama Order of the Daleks (2016). They are depicted as having ornate, stained glass casings and are harboured by monks of the Brotherhood of the Black Petal on the technologically undeveloped planet Strellin. The Stained Glass Dalek concept was created by Mike Tucker, with the cover artwork for the audio production being designed and rendered by Chris Thompson.

New Paradigm Dalek Emperor
Appearing at the climax of "City of the Daleks" (2010), the first instalment of the video game Doctor Who: The Adventure Games, the New Paradigm Dalek Emperor is almost identical to the New Series Emperor Dalek seen in the 2005 episode The Parting of the Ways. Notable differences are the dome and eye assembly, which are of the New Paradigm design, and a blue colour scheme.

The Eternity Clock Dalek Emperor
Featured in the video game Doctor Who: The Eternity Clock (2012), this version of the Dalek Emperor first appears as a large, levitating, purple sphere, studded with silver hemispheres. This is shown to be a shell which can expand and split into sixteen vertical segments, positionable to form a defensive barrier. The internal structure is mainly of the New Paradigm design, consisting of a large dome incorporating a foreshortened eye stalk and thin, extended dome lights, supported by an inverted neck bin. Below this a conical metallic structure tapers downward towards a circular, rotating weapons platform to which it is connected by an energy field. Arranged evenly around the edge of the platform are three "New Series" Dalek style gun sticks.

Other notable Dalek variants

Dark Dimension Dalek
"Lost in the Dark Dimension" was the working title of a feature-length BBC Doctor Who episode, planned to celebrate the programme's thirtieth anniversary. Chris Fitzgerald at Jim Henson's Creature Shop was engaged to redesign the Special Weapons Dalek for the production. A sketch of the proposed variant was produced at the time by BBC artist Alan Marshall. Notable differences from a standard Dalek include a substantially enlarged fender, an enhanced midsection featuring two large shoulder-mounted cannon and a foreshortened neck bin encircled by three thick neck rings. Programme development commenced in June 1992 and was officially cancelled in July 1993, with the BBC citing financial and logistical reasons. Although a Dark Dimension Dalek prop was never constructed by the BBC it has become the subject of a number of illustrations and a full size version built by a fan.

See also

Dalek
History of the Daleks
Dalek comic strips, illustrated annuals and graphic novels
Cult of Skaro
Davros
Skaro

References

Bibliography

External links

Dalek variants – List of Dalek variants at TARDIS Data Core, an external wiki.
Dalek 6388 – A comprehensive episode-by-episode guide to the Dalek prop variants.
Dalek Planet – Illustrations of Dalek variants with a design/colour guide.
The Doctor Who Site: Dalek Types – Dalek colour schemes and hierarchy. 
Project Dalek – Dalek variant plans and reference material.
The Mind Robber: Dalek Spotter's Guide – Illustrations of the Dalek types and colour schemes shown in Doctor Who.
The Ultimate Adventure – The Ultimate Adventure stage play website.
Altered Vistas: In the Comics – Doctorless Strips – Detailed listing of Dalek comic book appearances.
BBC Doctor Who Website: The Daleks – Photo galleries and video clips of major Dalek appearances and variants from 1963 to the present day.
BBC Doctor Who TV: The Daleks – A brief history of the Daleks.

Daleks
Doctor Who races
Extraterrestrial supervillains
Fictional cyborgs
Fictional mutants